Mononen is a Finnish surname. Notable people with the surname include:

Johannes Mononen (born 1991), Finnish footballer
Kalevi Mononen (1920–1996), Finnish cross-country skier
Lauri Mononen (born 1950), Finnish ice hockey player
Matti Mononen (born 1983), Finnish pole vaulter
Unto Mononen (1930–1968), Finnish songwriter and musician

References

Finnish-language surnames